Phil Rosenthal (born July 14, 1963) is a general and sports media columnist, formerly of the Chicago Tribune. He joined the newspaper in early 2005 as a business writer, authoring the "Tower Ticker" column, and was promoted in June 2011, before taking a buyout in June 2021 after Tribune Publishing was bought out by Alden Global Capital. He had previously worked for the Chicago Sun-Times, Los Angeles Daily News, The Capital Times of Madison, Wisconsin, and the News Sun of Waukegan, Illinois.

Biography
Rosenthal was born in Chicago and grew up in Lake Bluff, Illinois. He is a graduate of Lake Forest High School and the University of Wisconsin–Madison. He has been chairman of the UW-Madison School of Journalism and Mass Communication's Board of Visitors.

Lake Bluff's Rosenthal Field is named for Rosenthal's late father, a former youth baseball coach and elementary school board member. Rosenthal's mother was once Lake Bluff's village clerk and served on the local high school board.

Rosenthal is married to the former Jennie Zbikowski, half-sister of former pro football player Tom Zbikowski.

External links
Rosenthal's recent Chicago Tribune columns
Rosenthal's Tribune bio
Rosenthal's inactive Tower Ticker media blog for the Chicago Tribune

1963 births
Living people
Chicago Tribune people
Chicago Sun-Times people
American columnists
Jewish American journalists
American male journalists
People from Lake Bluff, Illinois
University of Wisconsin–Madison alumni
Journalists from Illinois
Lake Forest High School (Illinois) alumni
20th-century American journalists
21st-century American Jews